The Sainthwar, or Mall, is an Indian caste of landholders native to the Uttar Pradesh state.
	
The Sainthwars are closely related to the  Kshatriyas, and sometimes described as a division of the Rajput caste.  
Sainthwars were mentioned as landholding community along with Kshatriya , Bhumihar, Tyagi in United Provinces.Saithwar were listed as separate community along with Kshatriya in Caste census of 1911,1921 and 1931. The Sainthwars are known as "Mall"and also as Gansangik Kshatriya . They are the dominant landholding caste in some districts of Uttar Pradesh.

The oral tradition of the Sainthwars traces their ancestry to Chandraketu, a son of the legendary hero Lakshmana.

Bharatiya Janata Party politician RPN Singh belongs to the Saithwar community and is a prominent leader from Eastern Uttar Pradesh.
|

References

Social groups of Uttar Pradesh